Günther Wolkenaer (1958/1959 – March 2016) is a West German slalom canoeist who competed from the late 1970s to the late 1980s. He won two bronze medals at the ICF Canoe Slalom World Championships, earning them in 1985 (C-2) and 1987 (C-2 team).

He died in March 2016 at the age of 57, three days after an accident with a two horse cart in the Dolomites on 21 March.

References

External links
 
 Günther WOLKENAER at CanoeSlalon.net

German male canoeists
2016 deaths
Year of birth missing
Medalists at the ICF Canoe Slalom World Championships